"Red Rubber Ball" is a pop song written by Paul Simon of Simon & Garfunkel and Bruce Woodley of The Seekers and recorded by The Cyrkle, whose version reached  2 on the US Billboard Hot 100, and in South Africa and New Zealand. In Canada, the song reached No. 1.

Synopsis
"Red Rubber Ball" is sung from the perspective of a man at the end of an unfulfilling relationship in which his significant other never gave him much attention or affection. He now looks forward to the future with a positive attitude, proclaiming that “the morning sun is shining like a red rubber ball”.

Recordings
According to Cyrkle guitarist Tom Dawes, Simon offered "Red Rubber Ball" to the band when they were opening for Simon and Garfunkel on tour.  The song's tracks were recorded in stereo, with the bass, lead guitar, and percussion on the right track, acoustic guitar and electric organ on left, and the vocals on both.

The Columbia picture sleeve issued with the "Red Rubber Ball" single is a very rare and oft-sought item amongst record collectors; near-mint copies are said to fetch three figures.

The Seekers also recorded "Red Rubber Ball" for their 1966 album Come the Day (called Georgy Girl in the USA). It also appears on the CD box set The Seekers Complete.

In an interview on The Colbert Report, Paul Simon said he wrote "Red Rubber Ball" while living in England to get a £100 advance from The Seekers.  This came in response to Colbert's request for Simon to name a song that was "on the cusp" when it came to being included in his songbook Lyrics 1964–2008.

In the US, "Red Rubber Ball" spent a single week at No. 2 on the Billboard Hot 100 pop singles chart at the same time "Paperback Writer" by The Beatles was at No. 1, during the week ending July 9, 1966.  It was the fifth week during 1966 in which songs written by Simon and by John Lennon and Paul McCartney were simultaneously at No. 1 and No. 2 on the chart.

Cover versions
Mel Tormé on his 1966 album Right Now!
Neil Diamond on his 1966 debut album The Feel of Neil Diamond.
Cliff Richard for his 1968 film soundtrack Two a Penny.
Cilla Black on her 1969 album Surround Yourself with Cilla.
Eggchair recorded a version that was played in the 2004 movie, Dodgeball: A True Underdog Story.
Canadian punk rock group The Diodes had it as the first track on their debut album, The Diodes (1977).  According to the liner notes of the 1998 Diodes anthology, Tired of Waking Up Tired, the band recorded the cover because Paul Simon had been vocal in his disapproval of punk rock music.
Simon and Garfunkel recorded a live version in 1967 that was not released until their 1997 compilation album Old Friends.
American ska punk group Streetlight Manifesto for their 2010 album, 99 Songs of Revolution.
Nellie McKay on her 2015 album, My Weekly Reader.
Del Shannon 
The short-lived bluegrass supergroup Spectrum (Bela Fleck, Jimmy Gaudreau, Mark Schatz, and Glenn Lawson) on their 1980 debut "Opening Roll".

References

External links
 Lyrics of this song

1966 songs
1966 singles
Songs written by Paul Simon
Songs written by Bruce Woodley
The Cyrkle songs
Mel Tormé songs
Neil Diamond songs
Cilla Black songs
Simon & Garfunkel songs
Del Shannon songs
RPM Top Singles number-one singles
Columbia Records singles